River Runs Red is a 2018 American thriller film written and directed by Wes Miller and starring Taye Diggs, John Cusack and George Lopez.

Cast
Taye Diggs as Charles Coleman Sr.
John Cusack as Horace
George Lopez as Javier
Luke Hemsworth as Von
Gianni Capaldi as Rory
Briana Evigan as Marilyn
RJ Mitte as Officer Thomas
Steven Berrebi	as Brass One
Jaqueline Fleming as Professor Lawless
Jennifer Tao as Eve

Release
The film had its world premiere at the Heartland Film Festival on October 13, 2018. Its theatrical release began on November 9, 2018.

Reception

Box office
River Runs Red grossed $9,893 in the United States and Canada and $51,896 in other territories for a worldwide total of $61,789.

Critical response
Glenn Kenny of RogerEbert.com gave it one star.

References

External links
 
 

2018 films
2018 thriller films
American thriller films
Films shot in Louisville, Kentucky
Films shot in Kentucky
Films shot in Portland, Oregon
Films set in Philadelphia
2010s English-language films
Films directed by Wes Miller
2010s American films